"Gotta Go Solo" is a song recorded by American singer Patti LaBelle featuring Ronald Isley. It was written by LaBelle, Gordon Chambers, and Troy Taylor, while production was helmed by Chambers and Taylor. "Gotta Go Solo" was released as a standalone single in 2004 and later included as a bonus track on the Japanese edition of  her 2005 studio album Classic Moments. It peaked at number one on the US Adult R&B Songs.

Track listings

Credits and personnel 
Credits adapted from the liner notes of Classic Moments.

Gordon Chambers – producer, writer
Jean-Marie Horvat – mixing engineer
Ernie Isley – guitar
Patti Labelle – vocals, writer
Troy Taylor – instruments, producer, writer

Charts

References

2004 singles
2004 songs
Patti LaBelle songs